Borjas is a surname. Notable people with the surname include:

George J. Borjas (born 1950), Cuban-born American economist
Lorena Borjas (1960-2020) Mexican-American transgender rights activist
Melissa Borjas (born 1986), Honduran football referee
René Borjas (1897-1931), Uruguayan football player